Alexander Sena Kudjoe Addai (born 20 December 1993) is an English professional footballer who plays for Leatherhead as a winger.

Club career
Addai started his career in the Tottenham Hotspur youth system. He joined Blackpool in 2010 and was given his first professional deal ahead of the 2012–13 season. He then played for a number of non-league sides Carshalton Athletic, Whitehawk, Crawley Down Gatwick, Kingstonian, Grays Athletic and Wingate & Finchley before joining Merstham in July 2016. In his final season at the club, Addai racked up nine goals in thirty-nine league appearances.

Addai returned to league football with a move to League Two side Cheltenham Town in May 2018, on a one-year contract. He made his professional home debut against Crawley Town, however Cheltenham lost the game 1–0. Addai played frequently throughout the season and signed a new one-year deal in April 2019, with an option for a further year that would be triggered by appearances, when then led to his contract being extended into the 2020-21 season. On 20 November 2020, Addai joined Maidenhead United on a one-month loan. In April 2021, he joined Solihull Moors on loan until the end of the season. He made 10 appearances on loan at Solihull Moors, scoring 1 goal. He was released by Cheltenham Town at the end of the season. He signed for Torquay United in September 2021. On 10 December 2021, Addai joined Hemel Hempstead Town after his short-term contract with Torquay United came to an end. On 22 February 2022, Addai returned to former club Kingstonian. In June 2022, Addai joined Sittingbourne. On 26 November 2022, Addai joined Margate on a one-month loan deal, before joining Faversham Town on loan in December. In February 2023, he joined Leatherhead.

Personal life
Born in England, Addai is of Ghanaian descent.

Career statistics

References

1993 births
Living people
Footballers from Stepney
English footballers
English people of Ghanaian descent
Association football wingers
Tottenham Hotspur F.C. players
Blackpool F.C. players
Carshalton Athletic F.C. players
Whitehawk F.C. players
Crawley Down Gatwick F.C. players
Kingstonian F.C. players
Grays Athletic F.C. players
Wingate & Finchley F.C. players
Merstham F.C. players
Cheltenham Town F.C. players
Maidenhead United F.C. players
Solihull Moors F.C. players
Torquay United F.C. players
Hemel Hempstead Town F.C. players
Sittingbourne F.C. players
Margate F.C. players
Faversham Town F.C. players
Leatherhead F.C. players
Isthmian League players
National League (English football) players
English Football League players